Marilyn Gay Peddell is an international lawn and indoor bowls competitor for Australia, from Bribie Island.

Bowls career
In 1996, Peddell won the gold medal in the fours at the 1996 World Outdoor Bowls Championship in Adelaide. Two years later she won a silver medal at the 1998 Commonwealth Games in the fours. In addition she finished runner-up to Betty Brown in the 2001 World Indoor Bowls Championship at Great Yarmouth.

She won three medals at the Asia Pacific Bowls Championships including a 1997 fours gold medal in Warilla.

She won the Kingscliff Pairs in 1996 and in 2002 and has won the Queensland Champion of Champions singles title in 2008 and 2009.

She was the runner-up in the 'W.I.B.C.' Ladies Singles for the Christine Peacock Trophy in 2000/2001. She lost the last game of the Asia Pacific championship which cost her the gold medal, and she was afterwards excluded from the Australian team in 2002. A portrait of her was hung in the Archibald Prize in 2000.

References

Living people
Australian female bowls players
Commonwealth Games silver medallists for Australia
Bowls players at the 1998 Commonwealth Games
Sportswomen from Queensland
Year of birth missing (living people)
Commonwealth Games medallists in lawn bowls
Bowls World Champions
20th-century Australian women
Medallists at the 1998 Commonwealth Games